The 1883 Manitoba general election and was held on January 23, 1883.

References 

1883
1883 elections in Canada
1883 in Manitoba
January 1883 events